The 2005–06 Welsh Alliance League is the 22nd season of the Welsh Alliance League, which is in the third level of the Welsh football pyramid.

The league consists of sixteen teams and concluded with Prestatyn Town as champions and promoted to the Cymru Alliance. Cemaes Bay were relegated to the Gwynedd League and Penmaenmawr Phoenix were relegated to the Clwyd League.

Teams
Bodedern Athletic were champions in the previous season. They were replaced by Cemaes Bay who were relegated from the Cymru Alliance and Nefyn United who were promoted from the Gwynedd League.

Grounds and locations

League table

References

External links
Welsh Alliance League

Welsh Alliance League seasons
3
Wales